Johnson Branch (also called Johnson Creek) is a stream in Franklin County in the U.S. state of Missouri. It is a tributary of the Meramec River.
 
Johnson Branch has the name of the local Johnson family.

See also
List of rivers of Missouri

References

Rivers of Franklin County, Missouri
Rivers of Missouri